Frank Seifert (born 2 October 1972) is a German former footballer.

Career 
A midfielder or forward, Seifert played youth football for Einheit and later Dynamo Dresden, also representing East Germany at youth level. After reunification, he moved to VfB Stuttgart, where he played in the reserve team for two years. He then spent three years at both Chemnitzer FC and Energie Cottbus, playing a season in the 2. Bundesliga for both clubs. At Cottbus he also played in the 1997 DFB-Pokal Final.

His last season at Cottbus was marred by injury, and he moved in 1998, joining VfB Leipzig. Two years in Leipzig were followed by spells with Rot-Weiß Erfurt and Dresdner SC, before he dropped down into local football, playing for Brandenburg side SG Blau-Gelb Laubsdorf from 2003–2006.

In 2006, Seifert returned to Dresden, and returned to senior football, joining FV Dresden 06. Two years later he moved across town to SC Borea, before retiring from the game in 2009.

External links

1972 births
Living people
German footballers
VfB Stuttgart II players
Chemnitzer FC players
FC Energie Cottbus players
1. FC Lokomotive Leipzig players
FC Rot-Weiß Erfurt players
Dresdner SC players
2. Bundesliga players
Association football midfielders
Footballers from Dresden
East German footballers
People from Bezirk Dresden